The Pangborn-Herndon Memorial Site is a monument in (present-day) East Wenatchee, Washington, dedicated to Clyde Pangborn and Hugh Herndon, Jr., the two men who made the first non-stop flight across the Pacific Ocean. They departed from Misawa, Japan, on October 4, 1931, and they landed near this site 41 hours later.  
The column is topped by  wings made of aluminum.
This was in an unincorporated area in 1931, but the town of Wenatchee, Washington, was nearby. It was Mr. Pangborn's home town.

References

Sources
Young, Don; Young, Marjorie (1999). Adventure Guide to the Pacific Northwest, Hunter Publishing, Inc.

1968 sculptures
Air transportation on the National Register of Historic Places 
Buildings and structures in Douglas County, Washington
Monuments and memorials on the National Register of Historic Places in Washington (state)
National Register of Historic Places in Douglas County, Washington